Ernst Henrik Estlander (18 September 1870, Helsinki – 5 February 1949) was a Finnish legal scholar, professor at the University of Helsinki and politician. He was a member of the Diet of Finland from 1897 to 1906 and of the Parliament of Finland from 1907 to 1913 and again from 1916 to 1945, representing the Swedish People's Party of Finland (SFP). During the Continuation War, he was among the signatories of the "Petition of the Thirty-three", which was presented to President Ryti on 20 August 1943 by members of the Peace opposition.

Outside of politics, he also competed as a sailor at the 1912 Summer Olympics.

References

1870 births
1949 deaths
Politicians from Helsinki
People from Uusimaa Province (Grand Duchy of Finland)
Swedish People's Party of Finland politicians
Members of the Diet of Finland
Members of the Parliament of Finland (1907–08)
Members of the Parliament of Finland (1908–09)
Members of the Parliament of Finland (1909–10)
Members of the Parliament of Finland (1910–11)
Members of the Parliament of Finland (1911–13)
Members of the Parliament of Finland (1916–17)
Members of the Parliament of Finland (1917–19)
Members of the Parliament of Finland (1919–22)
Members of the Parliament of Finland (1922–24)
Members of the Parliament of Finland (1924–27)
Members of the Parliament of Finland (1927–29)
Members of the Parliament of Finland (1929–30)
Members of the Parliament of Finland (1930–33)
Members of the Parliament of Finland (1933–36)
Members of the Parliament of Finland (1936–39)
Members of the Parliament of Finland (1939–45)
People of the Finnish Civil War (White side)
Finnish people of World War II
Finnish legal scholars
University of Helsinki alumni
Academic staff of the University of Helsinki
Finnish male sailors (sport)
Sailors at the 1912 Summer Olympics – 10 Metre
Olympic sailors of Finland